Claude Lelièvre (born 19 May 1946) is the Commissioner for Children Rights of the French (i.e., French-speaking) Community of Belgium, an office similar to the Children's Ombudsman agencies elsewhere.

In 1994, he falsely denounced Belgian journalist Pierre Swennen as a paedophile, based on false information provided by Marie-France Botte, notably causing Swennen to lose his job. The claim was unfounded but Lelièvre refused to reveal his source, preventing a proper investigation. In 2004, it was finally proven that the accusation was false, and Botte was ordered to pay substantial damages.

See also 

 Jean-Denis Lejeune

External links
  Official web site of the Commissioner for Children Rights, French-speaking Community
  Biography on the same site

1946 births
Living people